The 1902 Maine gubernatorial election took place on September 8, 1902.

Incumbent Republican Governor John Fremont Hill was re-elected to a second term in office, defeating Democratic candidate Samuel Wadsworth Gould.

Results

Notes

References

Gubernatorial
1902
Maine
September 1902 events